Weight for Age (WFA) is a term in thoroughbred horse racing which is one of the conditions for a race.

History
The principle of WFA was developed by Admiral Rous, a handicapper with the English Jockey Club. Rous experimented with weights until he arrived at a relationship between age and maturity, expressed in terms of weight. His original scale has undergone only minor alterations since his work in the 1860s.

Description
Weight for age means that a horse will carry a set weight in accordance with the Weight for Age Scale. This weight varies depending on the horse's age, its sex, the race distance and the month of the year. Weight for age races are usually Group 1 races, races of the highest quality.  It is a form of handicapping for horse racing, but within the horse racing industry is not referred to as handicap, which is reserved for more general handicapping.

WFA is a method of trying to equal out the physical progress which the average thoroughbred racehorse makes as it matures. The thoroughbred matures extremely quickly compared to the human being. By the age of two the horse has achieved 95% of its mature height and weight, and by the end of its third year it will be fully mature. To allow for this variation in maturity in the context of racing, it is necessary to express it as a function of the weight a horse will carry in a race. It is also necessary to take into account the race distance because stamina comes with maturity, and younger horses are at a greater disadvantage the farther they have to run. If no allowance was made, a mature older horse would always beat a younger one.

Top WFA races

Australia
 Australian Cup
 The BMW Stakes
 Cox Plate
 The Everest
 Queen Elizabeth Stakes (ATC)
 Queen's Cup in its early days (later changed to Group 3)

France
 Prix de l'Arc de Triomphe

Ireland
 Irish Champion Stakes
 Irish St. Leger

Japan
 Japan Cup

New Zealand
 New Zealand International Stakes
  Spring Classic (formerly the Kelt Capital Stakes)

South Africa
 King's Plate
 Horse Chestnut Stakes
 Metropolitan Stakes
 Premier's Champion Challenge
 Paddock Stakes
 Majorca Stakes
 Champions Cup
 Gold Challenge

United Kingdom
 Diamond Jubilee Stakes
 Eclipse Stakes
 July Cup
 Sussex Stakes
 King George VI and Queen Elizabeth Stakes
 International Stakes
 Nunthorpe Stakes
 Sprint Cup
 Queen Elizabeth II Stakes
 Champion Stakes

United States
 Breeders' Cup Classic
 Breeders' Cup Turf
 Breeders' Cup Mile
 Breeders' Cup Sprint
 Jockey Club Gold Cup
 Joe Hirsch Turf Classic Stakes

Uruguay
 Gran Premio José Pedro Ramírez
 Gran Premio Pedro Piñeyrúa
 Gran Premio Ciudad de Montevideo

Sources
Australian Rules of Racing.
Weight for Age Advice
U.S. Scale of Weights from about.com

Horse racing terminology